Chaleh Bijar (also Romanized as Chāleh Bījār; also known as Chāleh Bījār-e Lemīr) is a village in Chubar Rural District, Haviq District, Talesh County, Gilan Province, Iran. At the 2006 census, its population was 378, in 85 families.

References 

Populated places in Talesh County